Elizabeth, Lady Bernard (née Hall, formerly Nash) (baptised 21 February 1608 – 17 February 1670) was the granddaughter of the English poet, playwright and actor William Shakespeare. Despite two marriages, she had no  children, and was his last surviving descendant.

Elizabeth was closely associated with the Royalist cause during the English Civil War. Both her husbands were dedicated supporters of Charles I.

Early life
Elizabeth Hall was born to Susanna Hall and Doctor John Hall. She was baptised in the Holy Trinity Church of Stratford-upon-Avon, England. She was the only grandchild William Shakespeare ever knew, because her three cousins were born after his death in 1616.

First marriage

In 1626, Elizabeth Hall married Thomas Nash, who was a member of the Manor and Lordship of Shottery. Nash was an ardent Royalist, a supporter of Charles I and indeed a donor to the king's cause to the tune of £100. In July 1643 the queen Henrietta Maria stayed with the Nashes at New Place.

Thomas made his will on 25 August 1642, in which he left his house in Chapel Street and two meadows to Elizabeth. However, he left the bulk of his fortune to his cousin, Edward Nash. On 4 April 1647, Thomas died, leaving Elizabeth a widow.

Second marriage
On 5 June 1649, eighteen months after her husband's death, Elizabeth married John Bernard (1604–74) of Abington, near Northampton. Bernard was a widower with several children. It is not known how they met, since he did not live near Stratford, but it was most likely through Elizabeth's Royalist connections. Like Nash, he had been a strong supporter of the Royalists in the Civil War. Five weeks after the marriage, Elizabeth's mother Susanna died. As a result, Elizabeth inherited the Shakespeare family property. The couple moved to Stratford, to live in New Place.

As a staunch Royalist, Bernard's social position improved dramatically after the Restoration in 1660. He was knighted on 25 September 1661, thus giving his wife the title Lady Bernard. They left Stratford to move into the Bernard family home in Abington. The couple had no children.

In February 1662, Judith Quiney died in Stratford-upon-Avon, making Elizabeth Bernard the last descendant of William Shakespeare. She wrote her will on 29 January 1669, which did not give much to her husband, Sir John Bernard. Elizabeth died at Abington, Northamptonshire on 17 February 1670. There is a memorial plaque in the Church of Saint Peter & Paul, Abington, where she is buried.

The family home of Sir John and Lady Bernard is now a museum, Abington Park Museum, and the grounds are now a park in the town of Northampton.

See also
 Shakespeare's life

References

External links
 Shakespeare's Granddaughter and the Bagleys of Dudley
 Shakespeare's Family

1608 births
1670 deaths
Shakespeare family
People from Stratford-upon-Avon
People from Abington, Northamptonshire